Baramee Limwattana (born January 4, 1996), is a Thai professional footballer.

Personal life
Baramee has a brother Sansern Limwattana is also a footballer and plays for Bangkok United as a midfielder.

Honours

Club
Chainat Hornbill
 Thai League 2 (1); 2017

References

1996 births
Living people
Baramee Limwattana
Baramee Limwattana
Association football midfielders
Waitakere United players
Baramee Limwattana
Baramee Limwattana
New Zealand Football Championship players
Baramee Limwattana
Baramee Limwattana
Thai expatriate footballers
Thai expatriate sportspeople in New Zealand
Expatriate association footballers in New Zealand